Jasic Technology Company Ltd. is a Chinese corporation operating out of Shenzhen, in the province of Guangdong. Its headquarters are in Pingshan New District.

The company manufactures and sells inverter welding machines, engine driven welders and other welder equipment primarily used in construction. Jasic is listed on The Shenzhen Stock Exchange.

Jasic was the center of a labor and political conflict in the city of Guangdong, referred to as the Jasic Incident.

Overview 
Jasic Technology Company was founded in 2005 in Shenzhen, Guangdong. Jasic presently operates three factories in Shenzhen: Jasic Industrial Park, Chongqing Yunda Industrial Park, and Chengdu Jasic Industrial Park.

2018 labour dispute 

The Jasic Technology Company was at the center of a widely reported controversy regarding the treatment of employees at Jasic Industrial Park in Shenzhen. Workers at the plant cited low pay, long hours, poor working conditions and, in addition, accused the management of Jasic of violating Chinese labor laws through illegal coerced overtime and excessive  company fines.

In May 2018 several employees of Jasic petitioned to form a labor union with the All-China In Federation of Trade Unions, which was rejected. The workers decided to continue to build their union independently, workers reported that union organizers were attacked and beaten so after. Tensions sparked on 27 July when twenty nine workers and supporters were arrested and allegedly beaten by Shenzhen Police.

In response to the arrests, at noon on Monday, 6 August a group of eighty demonstrators publicly protested against the detainment outside of the Yanziling police station.

"At noon on Monday, about 80 supporters staged a second rally under the scorching sun outside Yanziling police station in Shenzhen’s Pingshan district, about 50 km (31 miles) from the border with Hong Kong. More than 40 Communist Party members and retired cadres, who are part of the country’s leading Maoist internet forum, Utopia, joined the rally."

A wide range of public figures condemned Chinese suppression of labor activists including MIT professor Noam Chomsky, Chinese labor activist Li Qiang,  University of Hong Kong professor Pan Yi, Chris Chan King-chi, Marxist philosopher Slavoj Žižek, American socialist journal Jacobin, Amnesty International, Human Rights Watch, and Cornell University.

References

External links 

 Official Twitter (English)
 Official Website (English)



Companies listed on the Shenzhen Stock Exchange
Manufacturing companies based in Shenzhen
Chinese companies established in 2005
Technology companies of China
Welding
Jasic incident